Morne is an Old-French word for a small mountain. It may refer to:
 Morne a Chandelle, a village in the Sud-Est department of Haiti
 Morne-à-l'Eau, a commune in Guadeloupe
 Morne Bois-Pin, the fourth highest mountain in Haiti
 Morne la Vigie, hill and extinct cinder cone in Haiti
 Morne Ciseaux, a town on the island of Saint Lucia
 Morne Criquet, a quartier of Saint Barthélemy
 Morne de Dépoudré, a quartier of Saint Barthélemy in the Caribbean
 Morne de la Grande Montagne, the highest point of Saint Pierre and Miquelon 
 Morne Diablotins, the highest mountain in Dominica
 Morne du Cibao, the third highest mountain in Haiti
 Morne du Vitet, the highest point of Saint Barthélemy
 Morne Docteur, a town in Saint George Parish, Grenada
 Morne Fendue, a town in Saint Patrick Parish, Grenada
 Morne Fortune, a hill and residential area located south of Castries, Saint Lucia
 Morne Jaloux, a town in Saint George Parish, Grenada
 Morne Jaloux Ridge, a town in Saint George Parish, Grenada
 Morne Longue, a town in Saint Andrew Parish, Grenada
 Morne Rachette, a village on the west coast of Dominica
 Morne Rouge (disambiguation)
 Morne Seychellois, the highest peak in Seychelles
 Morne Tranquille, a town in Saint David Parish, Grenada
 Morne Trois Pitons National Park, a World Heritage Site in Dominica
 Morne Watt, a stratovolcano in the south of the island of Dominica
 Gros Morne (disambiguation)
 Le Morne Brabant, a peninsula at the extreme south-western tip of Mauritius
 Le Morne-Vert, a commune in the French overseas department of Martinique

other
 Morne Constant anole (Anolis ferreus), a species of anole lizard endemic to the island of Marie-Galante

See also
 Morné (given name)
 Arvid Mörne (1876-1946), a Finnish author and poet